The Greg Norman Holden International was a men's professional golf tournament on the PGA Tour of Australasia. It was founded by Greg Norman in 1993, replacing the Johnnie Walker Australian Classic on the tour schedule, and was held until 2001. It was also co-sanctioned with the European Tour in 2000 and 2001. It was known as the Greg Norman's Holden Classic from 1993 to 1996.

Tournament hosts
1999–2001 The Lakes Golf Club
1998 The Australian Golf Club
1996 Royal Melbourne Golf Club
1995 The Lakes Golf Club
1994 Royal Melbourne Golf Club
1993 The Lakes Golf Club

Winners

Notes

References

External links
Coverage from 2006 PGA Tour of Australasia's Media Guide Results on page 166
Coverage on the European Tour's official site

Former PGA Tour of Australasia events
Former European Tour events
Golf tournaments in Australia
Recurring sporting events established in 1993
Recurring sporting events disestablished in 2001